The Socialist League (LS) was a tiny social-democratic party in Italy, founded by Bobo Craxi on 10 May 2000.

The Socialist League was already operating as a faction within the Italian Democratic Socialists (SDI), of which the LS was a founding member in 1998. A year later, Craxi was an unsuccessful SDI candidate in the 1999 European Parliament election, while Claudio Martelli was elected and later appointed SDI deputy leader.

In June 2000 both Craxi and Martelli left the SDI. In January 2001 the LS was merged with the Socialist Party to form the New Italian Socialist Party, allied with the centre-right coalition. Craxi was elected president of the new party, while Martelli was nominated spokesperson. Martelli left politics in 2004, while Craxi led a split from the NPSI in 2006 and launched The Italian Socialists, which was a founding component of the revived Italian Socialist Party in 2007.

References

External links
Official website (2000)
Party documents
Party logo
Conferenza stampa per «rilanciare l'autonomia socialista» (1/2/2000)
Assemblea nazionale della Ls (26/5/2000)
Assemblea I socialisti verso la costituzione del nuovo Psi con riformisti, laici, liberali e libertari per costruire la Sinistra delle libertà (20/6/2000)
Dibattito Nasce il nuovo Psi alla Festa Socialista della Ls (24/9/2000)
Assemblea programmatica della Lega Socialista-Nuovi Socialisti (16/12/2000)

2000 establishments in Italy
2001 disestablishments in Italy
Defunct social democratic parties in Italy
Defunct socialist parties in Italy
Political parties disestablished in 2001
Political parties established in 2000
Defunct political parties in Italy